The Pescara Circuit was a  race course made up entirely of public roads near Pescara, Italy that hosted the Coppa Acerbo auto race. Pescara is the longest circuit to ever host a Formula One Grand Prix.

The country and town roads used were both narrow and bumpy. Like many long circuits (such as the original Nürburgring and Spa-Francorchamps circuits), Pescara was revered as a fantastic driver's circuit, but also like Spa and the Nürburgring, it was extremely dangerous and unforgiving.

The long track travelled through a number of villages situated on hills surrounding Pescara, following a roughly triangular shape with its corners at the seaside municipality of Pescara. It was on "The Flying Kilometre" that Guy Moll was killed during the 1934 Coppa Acerbo. The track started just outside the middle of Pescara, moving west through the suburb of Rione Partenze, and then into the hilly villages of Frascone, Valle Carbone, Spoltore, and Case Fornace, going through a mixture of slow and fast bends before dropping out of the hills into the inland municipality of Cappelle sul Tavo, then down the first  straight northeast to Montesilvano before going down another  straight and returning to Pescara. 

The first race took place in 1924 and non-Championship Formula One races followed in the early 1950s, with one official Formula One World Championship event in  due to the cancellation of other races. The Pescara Grand Prix drew in excess of 200,000 spectators, and remains the longest circuit in terms of lap distance ever to stage a Formula One Grand Prix. But the circuit was feared even by Enzo Ferrari who did not send his cars to this race out of fear for his drivers' safety.

It was the first F1 circuit with an artificial chicane, built in 1934 on the start-finish straight to reduce speed in the pits after  of flat out.

The track's last race was a four-hour World Sportscar Championship race in 1961,  won by Lorenzo Bandini and Giorgio Scarlatti driving a Ferrari 250 TR for Scuderia Centro Sud. After that race the circuit was permanently retired as a racing venue as it was impossible for the organizers to guarantee the safety of drivers and spectators.

References

External links
 Etracksonline page on Pescara circuit
 Approximate circuit layout on Google Maps
 Approximate circuit layout on Motopaner

Pescara
Formula One circuits
Motorsport venues in Italy
Defunct motorsport venues in Italy
Pescara